Bhagat Ki Kothi railway station is a railway station on the North Western Railways network in the state of Rajasthan.

History 

The station is the point of origin of the Thar Express train service that connects Karachi, Pakistan to Jodhpur, India.

In February 2006, the station was revived after a period of 41 years. In the meantime the lines on both sides had been converted from metre gauge to broad gauge. This enabled the train to run from the border right up to Karachi, which was not possible earlier because there would be a change of gauge in between, either at Hyderabad or Mirpur Khas. The Thar Express is the oldest route, however, because it was damaged in the war it remained closed for 41 years. Upon restoration it became the new train service between the two countries.

Jodhpur–Bikaner Railway was merged with the Western Railway on 5 November 1951. Later North Western Railway came into existence on 1 October 2002.

Diesel Loco Shed 

A Diesel Loco Shed which was established in 1972 is located close by the station that houses 160+ EMD locomotives, including 19 WDP-4, 90+ WDG-4, 19 WDP-4B, 30+ WDP-4D & 1 WDG-4D.

See also

 
 http://www.indianrailways.gov.in/railwayboard/uploads/directorate/mec_engg/downloads/DLS/NWR/BGKTShed_history.pdf

References

External links

Railway stations in Jodhpur district
Transport in Jodhpur
Jodhpur railway division
Buildings and structures in Jodhpur